McAllister is an unincorporated community in Madison County, Montana, United States. The community has a post office with ZIP code 59740.

The post office opened in 1869 under the name Meadow Creek. It was renamed in 1896 for James Alexander McAllister Jr., son of a couple who settled in the area in 1871.

Demographics

References

Unincorporated communities in Madison County, Montana
Unincorporated communities in Montana